High Bridge, a railroad bridge over Latah Creek in Spokane, Washington, was constructed in 1972 by the Burlington Northern Railroad, following that railroad's creation in 1970 through the merger of the Chicago, Burlington & Quincy, Great Northern, Northern Pacific, and Spokane, Portland & Seattle railways. The bridge links the former Northern Pacific mainline with the former Great Northern and Spokane, Portland & Seattle lines to the west. The Latah Creek railroad bridge and two bridges carrying Interstate 90 and Sunset Highway cross High Bridge Park and the Latah/Hangman neighborhood of Spokane from Downtown Spokane on the east into the West Hills and Grandview/Thorpe neighborhoods to the west.

A ballasted concrete deck slab supports the railroad track. The western end of the bridge splits to form a wye.

Although not the architect on record, Warren C. Heylman is said to have been the architect behind the design of the bridge, writing Burlington Northern with his "free and unsolicited" advice after he saw the initial plans for the bridge over Hangman valley that was to replace the downtown rail line they had removed in preparation for Expo '74, saying he had to act after seeing their heavily trellised design that would have obscured the historic arches of the Latah Creek Bridge. Heylman never heard back from the railroad company, but says that bridge that was built, a much simpler design with long concrete legs that complemented the nearby I-90 bridge was his. According to the opinion of Washington State University architecture and engineering professor, David Scott, the bridge is arguably Heylman's best work, saying it is "one of the finest examples of what a railroad bridge can look like or be."

References

Buildings and structures in Spokane, Washington
Railroad bridges in Washington (state)
Viaducts in the United States
Box girder bridges in the United States
Steel bridges in the United States